Villa San José de Vinchina is a municipality and village in La Rioja Province in northwestern Argentina. It is the principal village of the Vinchina Department.

References

Populated places in La Rioja Province, Argentina